Turnersburg Township is a nonfunctioning administrative division in northeastern Iredell County, North Carolina, United States. Turnersburg township was established in 1868.  The only major town in Turnersburg township is Harmony, which is also partially within Eagle Mills township.

Geography

Turnersburg township is bordered on the north by Eagle Mills and Union Grove townships, on the west by Olin township, on the south by Cool Springs township, and on the east by Davie County.  The South Yadkin River is Turnersburg township's southern border.  Other bodies of water that flow through Turnersburg township are Dutchman Creek and Kinder Creek.  Skyview Lake and Skyview Lake Upper are within Turnersburg township.

Note:  The town of Turnersburg is not located in Turnersburg township.

Demography
Two years after formation of the township, the population of Turnersburg township was 876 in 1870, including 572 (65 percent) whites males and females and 304 (35 percent) Colored males and females.

History
By the requirements of the North Carolina Constitution of 1868, the county was divided into townships. Previous to that time, the subdivisions were Captain's Districts. While the Captain's Districts referred primarily to the militia, it served also for the election precinct, the tax listing and tax collecting district. Turnersburg Township has been used since 1870 as a census district.

Both the town of Turnersburg and Turnersburg township were named for the family of Wilfred Dent Turner (1855-1933), a lawyer, legislator, lieutenant governor, and businessman born in the town of Turnersburg.

Significant historical and geographic locations in Turnersburg Township include:
 B. Harbin Store

 Clarksbury Methodist Church
 Harmony (town)
 J. B. Parks Store
 J. C. Holmes Store
 Butler Mill
 G. H. Hayes Store
 Gaither House in Harmony
 Gum Grove School (District 5)
 Harmony School (District 1)
 J. C. Holmes Store
 Morrison–Campbell House near Harmony, owned by James E. Morrison and later Columbus Wilford Campbell
 Mt. Bethel Methodist Church
 Mt. Bethel Road
 Mt. Bethel School (District 3)
 Mt. Nebo Baptist Church
 River Hill School (District 4)
 Mt. Tabor Presbyterian Church
 Mt. Tabor School (District 2)
 Piney Grove AME Zion Church
 Pleasant View Baptist Church
 River Hill School
 Society Baptist Church, founded in 1823

References

Townships in Iredell County, North Carolina
Townships in North Carolina
1868 establishments in North Carolina